Yves Claoué (1927, Le Bouscat – 2001, Segonzac) was a 20th-century French composer.

Music 
 Concerto for harpsichord.
 Three mouvements for flute and piano.
 Sonate baroque in trio for organ.

Incidental music 
 1957:	Caesar and Cleopatra by George Bernard Shaw, directed by Jean Le Poulain (Théâtre Sarah Bernhard)
 1958:	 by Jacques Audiberti, directed by Jean Le Poulain (Théâtre du Vieux Colombier)
 La voix humaine by Cocteau (Théâtre central du Limousin) 
 1965:	Antigone after Sophocles, directed by Jean-Pierre Laruy
 Patmos, oratorio by Jean Cocteau and Yves Claoué. 
 1966:	George Dandin by Molière, directed by Jean-Pierre Laruy
	La Fleur à la bouche by Luigi Pirandello, directed by Jean-Pierre Laruy
 1967:	Le Cid by Pierre Corneille, directed by Pierre Valde
	Les Frères Karamazov by Jean-Pierre Laruy, directed by Jean-Pierre Laruy
 Cascade by Milorad Mišković (ballet) Opéra de Monte Carlo
 Minuterie by Jean Babilée
 1969:	Le Chant du fantoche lusitanien by Peter Weiss, directed by Jean-Pierre Laruy
 Anjou 33-93 by Jean Guelis 
 1970:	La Comédie des erreurs after William Shakespeare, directed by Georges-Henri Régnier
 1973:	Mother Courage and Her Children by Bertolt Brecht, directed by Jean-Pierre Laruy
 1984: Marat-Sade by Peter Weiss, directed by Gérard Laurent
1991–92: Phrases et Paraphrases sur la "Genèse", ensemble vocal, piano obligé
1992: Salve Regina for mixed choir

Film scores 
 1954: Buffet et son art, documentary by Étienne Périer 
 1959: Bobosse, by Étienne Périer, with François Périer, Micheline Presle, Jacques Fabbri
 1960: Murder at 45 R.P.M., by Étienne Périer, with Danielle Darrieux, Michel Auclair, Jean Servais
 1962: Un chien dans un jeu de quilles, by Fabien Collin

External links 
 
 Yves Claoué on Les archives du spectacle.net
 Yves Claoué on Data.bnf.fr

French ballet composers
French film score composers
20th-century French male classical pianists
1927 births
2001 deaths
French male film score composers